Wyoming Highway 154 (WYO 154) is a  Wyoming State Road located in central Goshen County that serves the communities of Veteran and Yoder southwest of Torrington.

Route description
Wyoming Highway 154 has a "C" like routing from its southern end at Wyoming Highway 152 in Yoder to US Route 85 south of Torrington. From WYO 152, Highway 154 heads west, continuing where WYO 152 leaves off. Highway 154 soon turns north to head to the community of Veteran, a Census-designated place (CDP) northwest of Yoder at just over 7 miles. WYO 154 passes through Veteran then heads northeast to US Route 85/Wyoming Highway 92 just south of the city of Torrington where it ends.

Major intersections

References

Official 2003 State Highway Map of Wyoming

External links 

Wyoming State Routes 100-199
WYO 154 - US 85/WYO 92 to WYO 152

Transportation in Goshen County, Wyoming
154